Morris Upham Ely (April 21, 1876 – December 14, 1932) was an American football player and coach. He served as the head football coach at Williams College in Williamstown, Massachusetts from 1904 to 1905, compiling a record of 9–12. Ely was a quarterback at Yale University in the late 1890s.  He later practiced law in Manhattan and was active in politics as a member of the Republican Party.  He died there, on December 14, 1932, when he committed suicide by jumping from the tenth floor of the building of 50 Vanderbilt Avenue, which houses the Yale Club of New York City.

Head coaching record

References

External links
 

1876 births
1932 suicides
19th-century players of American football
American football quarterbacks
Williams Ephs football coaches
Yale Bulldogs football players
Lawyers from New York City
New York (state) Republicans
Players of American football from New York (state)
Suicides by jumping in New York City